Mortimer Francis Dutra (October 3, 1899 – August 10, 1988) was an American professional golfer.

Dutra was born in Monterey, California and was the older brother of golfer Olin.

Dutta work as a club pro and teaching professional while also competing on the PGA Tour. He was the head pro at Red Run Golf Club in Detroit, Michigan from 1933 to 1942. While there, he won the Michigan Open in 1933 and the Michigan PGA Championship in 1934.

In the majors, Dutra was a semi-finalist in the 1927 PGA Championship, finished sixth  at the 1933 U.S. Open and played in the first two Masters Tournaments.

In 1955, Dutra won the PGA Seniors' Championship which would later become a Champions Tour major.

Professional wins
1922 Northern California PGA Championship
1933 Michigan Open
1934 Michigan PGA Championship
1955 PGA Seniors' Championship, World Senior Championship

Results in major championships

Note: Dutra never played in The Open Championship.
NYF = Tournament not yet founded
DNP = Did not play
R64, R32, R16, QF, SF = Round in which player lost in PGA Championship match play
"T" indicates a tie for a place
Yellow background for top-10

References

American male golfers
PGA Tour golfers
Golfers from California
Golfers from Detroit
Sportspeople from Monterey, California
1899 births
1988 deaths